A major appliance, also known as a large domestic appliance or large electric appliance or simply a large appliance, large domestic, or large electric, is a non-portable or semi-portable machine used for routine housekeeping tasks such as cooking, washing laundry, or food preservation. Such appliances are sometimes collectively known as white goods, as the products were traditionally white in colour, although a variety of colours are now available. An appliance is different from a plumbing fixture because it uses electricity or fuel.

Major appliances differ from small appliances because they are bigger and not portable.  They are often considered fixtures and part of real estate and as such they are often supplied to tenants as part of otherwise unfurnished rental properties. Major appliances may have special electrical connections, connections to gas supplies, or special plumbing and ventilation arrangements that may be permanently connected to the appliance. This limits where they can be placed in a home.

Since major appliances in a home consume a significant amount of energy, they have become the objectives of programs to improve their energy efficiency in many countries. Increasing energy efficiency is often described as an important element of climate change mitigation alongside other improvements like retrofitting buildings to increase building performance.  Energy efficiency improvements may require changes in construction of the appliances, or improved control systems.

Brands

In the early days of electrification, many major consumer appliances were made by the same companies that made the generation and distribution equipment. While some of these brand names persist to the present day, even if only as licensed use of old popular brand names, today many major appliances are manufactured by companies or divisions of companies that specialize in particular appliances.

Types 

Major appliances may be roughly divided as follows:
Refrigeration equipment
Freezer
Refrigerator
Water cooler
Ice maker
Cooking
Kitchen stove, also known as a range, cooker, oven, cooking plate, or cooktop
Wall oven
Steamer oven
Microwave oven
Washing and drying equipment
Washing machine
Clothes dryer
Drying cabinet
Dishwasher
Heating and cooling
Air conditioner
Furnace
Water heater
Whole house ventilator
Mechanical Air Ventilator

Efficiency

See also

 Small appliances
 Domestic technology
 Home automation (Domotics)
 E-waste
 Household chore
 List of cooking appliances
 List of home appliances
 List of stoves
 Yellow goods (retail classification)
 Black goods

References

External links

Energy Star Appliances

Electromechanical engineering
 
Consumer goods
Hardlines (retail)

nn:Kvitvarer